The M163 Vulcan Air Defense System (VADS) is a self-propelled anti-aircraft gun (SPAAG) that was used by the United States Army. The M168 gun is a variant of the General Dynamics  M61 Vulcan rotary cannon, the standard cannon in most U.S. combat aircraft since the 1960s, mounted on either an armored vehicle or a trailer.

Technical description
The weapon is mounted on a modified M113 vehicle (the M741 carrier). The system was designed to complement the M48 Chaparral missile system. The M163 uses a small, range-only radar, the AN/VPS-2, and an M61 optical lead-calculating sight. The system is suitable for night operations with the use of AN/PVS series night vision sights that can be mounted to the right side of the primary sight.

The gun fires at 3,000 rounds per minute in short bursts of 10, 30, 60, or 100 rounds, or it can fire in continuous fire mode at a rate of 1,000 rounds per minute. A linkless feed system is used.

Performance
The M163 had a fairly limited range from the start. Additionally, the radar was a range-only set incapable of finding targets.

In US and Israeli service, the VADS has rarely been needed in its intended purpose of providing defense against aerial threats—consequently, the Vulcan gun system was in use throughout the late 1980s and early 1990s primarily as a ground support weapon. For example, VADS guns were used to support American ground assault troops in Panama in 1989 during Operation Just Cause. One Vulcan of B Battery, 2/62 ADA sank a PDF  patrol boat. The last combat action the VADS participated in was Operation Desert Storm.

Upgrades and replacement
In order to provide effective battlefield air defense against helicopters equipped with anti-tank missiles that could be fired accurately from ranges of several kilometers, the VADS was slated to be replaced by the M247 Sergeant York DIVADS (Divisional Air Defense System), but that system was canceled due to cost overruns, technical problems and generally poor performance.

In 1984 the improved PIVADS (Product-Improved VADS) system was introduced, providing improvements in the ease of use and accuracy of fire, but the limitations of the 20x102 mm caliber remained. In 1988, the fourth crewmember was issued a Stinger launcher and two rounds.

Eventually, the M163 was replaced in US service by the M1097 Avenger and the M6 Linebacker, an M2 Bradley with FIM-92 Stinger missiles instead of the standard TOW anti-tank guided missiles: the Stinger missile providing the necessary range to deal with helicopters with anti-tank missiles far out-ranging the 20 mm gun, as well as considerably extending the reach against fixed-wing targets. The final US Army VADS-equipped unit at Fort Riley Kansas completed turn-in of its Vulcans in 1994.

Ammunition
While a large number of 20x102 mm round have been developed, not all were issued to M163 units. M246 HEI-T-SD was developed alongside the system and was the primary anti-air round, with M56 HEI being used for ground support. PIVADS units could use Mk 149 APDS rounds, which greatly increase maximum effective range due to their higher velocity and lack of a self-destruct. M940 may have been issued for use prior to withdrawal from service, though sources are unclear.

Specifications

 Armour layout:
 front: 
 sides: 
 rear/top: 
 bottom: 
 M168 gun on the M163:
 Effective range: 
 M246 (air targets): 
 Mk149 (air targets): 
 M56 (ground targets): 
 Maximum firing range: M246:  self-destruct
 Maximum rate of fire: 1,000 rpm unlimited, 3,000 rpm in burst of 10,30, 60, or 100 rounds
 Elevation: +80° to −5° at 45°/second
 Traverse: 360° at 60°/s
 Ammunition: 
 M167: 500 rounds. 
 M163: 1,100 rounds loaded, 1,000 rounds stowed

Variants
 M163 
 M163A1 changes to gun mount and vehicle to bring it in line with the M113A1. The resulting carrier vehicle was designated M741A1.
 M163A2 powertrain changes to bring it in line with the M113A2. The resulting carrier vehicle was designated M741A2.
 M163 PIVADS (1984) accuracy and workload improvements developed by Lockheed Electronics Company including a digital microprocessor, director sight and low backlash azimuth drive system. The PIVADS used the M741A1 carrier vehicle, and the improvements were carried over to the M163A2.
 M167 towed version of the turret. Prime mover was the Gama Goat until 1989 when the Humvee replaced it.
 Machbet Israeli upgraded version equipped with 4-tube FIM-92 Stinger pod, upgraded tracking system and the ability to share information with local high-power radar.

History of service
In the Israeli Air Defense Command the "Hovet" (the Israeli designation to the M163 VADS) scored 3 shoot-downs, including the first shoot-down of a jet warplane (a Syrian MiG-21 fighter jet) by the M163 VADS, during Operation Peace for Galilee in 1982. The Israel Defense Forces used the M163 Hovet also for fire support during urban warfare in Operation Peace for Galilee (1982) and Operation Defensive Shield (2002).

Operators

Current operators
  
  
  – 108 in service 
  
  – 120 in service with RJAF 
  
 
  
  – 24

Former operators
 
  – 36 ex-US M163 Vulcan SPAAG, never used, purchased to supply parts for the M113. 
  — following the closing of tactical Anti-Air units in the IDF, both the VADS and the upgraded VADS ('hovet', fitted with stingers) were retired in 2006.

See also
 Korkut
 Phalanx CIWS
 SIDAM 25

References

External links

 Globalsecurity.org
 AFV database

Self-propelled anti-aircraft weapons of the United States
Military vehicles introduced in the 1960s
Cold War weapons of the United States